The de Havilland DH.14 Okapi was a British two-seat day bomber of the 1910s built by de Havilland. The aircraft was designed as an Airco DH.4 and DH.9 replacement, but it never entered production.

Design and development

The Okapi was a scaled-up Airco DH.9 with a bigger engine, (the Rolls-Royce Condor) intended as a replacement for the DH.4 and DH.9. Three were built, but due to the end of the First World War the Royal Air Force was reluctant to accept them. The third aircraft was the first to fly, and it was completed by Airco as the DH.14A, a two-seat long-range mail plane. The two military aircraft were completed by de Havilland in 1921 and used for trials. One suffered a fatal crash at Burnham Beeches on 10 February 1922 and no production aircraft were ordered.

G-EAPY
The third aircraft was completed as the DH.14A to compete in the Daily Mail transatlantic flight competition. It had a Napier Lion engine and increased  fuel capacity. With the winning of the prize by Alcock and Brown the project was abandoned. The aircraft, registered G-EAPY, was then to be used by Sidney Cotton, who intended to try for the Australian government's £10,000 prize for a flight between England and Australia. Keith and Ross Smith won that prize before Cotton was ready.

The aircraft was loaned by Airco to Cotton to attempt the first flight between London and Cape Town. Cotton and an engineer from Napier left Hendon Aerodrome on 4 February 1920, but soon forced landed at Cricklewood with oil problems. Cotton reached Naples on the 21 February but they failed to find the aerodrome at Messina and they force-landed on a nearby beach.

G-EAPY was rebuilt by Airco with an additional third cockpit and sold to Cotton for use in the Aerial Derby.  The aircraft was badly damaged when it forced landed following an onboard fire near Hertford on 24 July 1920. When the other two DH.14s were completed by de Havilland at Stag Lane in 1921 the DH.14A was repaired again and joined the test flying with a military serial number.

Variants
 DH.14 – two-seat day bomber with a Rolls-Royce Condor engine, two built.
 DH.14A – two-seat long range mailplane with a Napier Lion Engine, one built.

Operators

Royal Air Force

Specifications (DH.14)

See also

References

Citations

Bibliography

Okapi
Single-engined tractor aircraft
Biplanes
1910s British bomber aircraft
Aircraft first flown in 1919